This is a list of plantations and/or plantation houses in the U.S. state of Mississippi that are National Historic Landmarks, listed on the National Register of Historic Places, listed on a heritage register, or are otherwise significant for their history, association with significant events or people, or their architecture and design.

See also  

List of plantations in the United States

References

Lists of buildings and structures in Mississippi
African-American history of Mississippi
Houses in Mississippi
Agriculture in Mississippi
History of slavery in Mississippi
Mississippi